Opogona dimidiatella is a moth of the  family Tineidae. It is found in southern South Africa, Kenya, Uganda,  Réunion, India, Indonesia (Java), Sri Lanka and the Philippines.

They are known to attack sugarcane in the fields.

It's the type species of the genus Opogona.

References

Moths described in 1853
Opogona
Moths of Sub-Saharan Africa
Moths of Réunion
Moths of Asia